Volkel Air Base  is a military airbase used by the Royal Netherlands Air Force (RNLAF) - Dutch: Koninklijke Luchtmacht (KLu), and is located near the village of Volkel, Netherlands. It is home to two F-16 Fighting Falcon squadrons, No 312 and No 313. A third squadron formerly present at the airfield, No 311 Sqn, was officially disbanded on 27 September 2012. It also houses a maintenance, logistical, a base Squadron for the RNLAF, and also the 703rd Munitions Support Squadron, part of the 52nd Fighter Wing from the United States Air Force. Besides military use, a trauma helicopter operated by ANWB Medical Air Assistance on behalf of the Radboud University Nijmegen Medical Centre is based here. The Dienst Luchtvaart Politie also makes use of Volkel Air Base.

Volkel Air Base is one of several military airfields in the Netherlands, and one of the three major operational bases of the RNLAF, the other two being Leeuwarden Air Base and Gilze-Rijen Air Base. Together with these, it also hosts the public viewing days of the RNLAF, held annually at one of these three airfields, having both an airshow and static display of various military and civilian aircraft.

History

After the occupation of the Netherlands by Germany in 1940, the Luftwaffe constructed a diversion airfield for night-fighter aircraft called Nachtlandeplatz Volkel. In 1943, the airfield was expanded into an operational Luftwaffe base, and renamed Fliegerhorst Volkel. It was home to III./NJG 2 operating Junkers Ju 88 night fighters, and II & III./JG 3 operating the Messerschmitt Bf 109G. The last German aircraft based at Volkel were jet-engined Me 262 fighters and Ar 234 reconnaissance bombers. To defend the airfield against aerial attacks, the Germans installed flak guns, but it was still bombed extensively. Attacks in 1944 in support of Operation Market Garden caused such extensive damage to the airfield that it could no longer be used by the Luftwaffe.

When the south of the Netherlands was liberated later that year, the Royal Air Force took control of the airfield. Though the Germans had destroyed most of the remaining airport facilities, the RAF continued to use the airport for the remainder of the war, operating Hawker Typhoon and Hawker Tempest aircraft from Volkel in support of the allied advance into Germany. French ace Pierre Clostermann, at the time a flight commander in No. 122 Wing RAF, provides a detailed description of operations from Volkel in early 1945 in his book The Big Show.

The Dutch Naval Aviation Service started flying from Volkel in 1949 for training purposes. In 1950, the Royal Netherlands Air Force took control of the airfield, restoring it to an operational fighter airfield. Gloster Meteor aircraft were the first jet aircraft to be based at Volkel for the RNLAF. Later came the Republic F-84 Thunderjet and Thunderstreak, which were eventually replaced by the Lockheed F-104 Starfighter, the first supersonic aircraft of the RNLAF. In the 1970s, airport facilities were improved, and 32 protective Hardened Aircraft Shelters (HAS) were constructed for the aircraft. Between 1982 and 1984, the Starfighters were slowly replaced by the F-16 Fighting Falcons that are currently situated at Volkel, which were manufactured under licence by Fokker. The current F-16 aircraft are expected to be replaced by the F-35 Lightning II.

Nuclear weapons

It is believed that since the early 1960s, USAF nuclear weapons have been stored at Volkel Air Base, to be used by the host nation's aircraft. Formerly, storage took place in a weapon storage area on the north side of the base, and in a heavily defended quick reaction alert (QRA) area; however, since 1991, eleven WS3 Weapon Storage and Security System vaults are operational in the floors of the aircraft shelters. The USAF 703rd Munitions Support Squadron (703rd MUNSS) is in charge of maintaining and securing the weapons. As of 2008, 22 B61 nuclear bombs are believed to be in storage at Volkel, to be used by the Dutch 311 and 312 F-16 squadrons at the base. The F-16s based at Volkel can at times be seen with BDU-38 dummy bombs, which are used to simulate the B61. Despite the evidence for this, the Dutch Ministry of Defence never officially acknowledges or denies the presence of nuclear weapons at Volkel. In a book published by former air force pilot Steve Netto it is revealed that some fifty B28 nuclear bombs were in storage there around the time of the Cuban Missile Crisis, which if needed were to be deployed by aircraft of the Royal Netherlands Air Force. In a document leaked as a part of the United States diplomatic cables leak the presence of nuclear weapons in the Netherlands is confirmed, though no specific location is given. On 10 June 2013, former Prime Minister Ruud Lubbers confirmed the existence of 22 nuclear weapons at the airfield. In a 2019 NATO draft report, Volkel was mentioned as one of six locations where, altogether, approximately 150 American B61 bombs are stored.

According to a May 2021 article from Bellingcat,  many sensitive security details about the nuclear arsenal at Volkel, such as which vaults currently had nuclear weapons in them, were inadvertently exposed when journalists discovered that the soldiers tasked with overseeing these weapons had been using publicly available flashcard websites to assist them in learning these details.

Based units
Units based at Volkel.

Royal Netherlands Air Force
No. 312 Strike Squadron – F-16 Fighting Falcon
No. 313 Tiger Squadron – F-35 Lightning II
No. 640 Squadron – Base operations
No. 900 Squadron – Maintenance
No. 901 Squadron – Logistics
Tactical Air Reconnaissance Center (TARC)

United States Air Force
US Air Forces in Europe - Air Forces Africa (USAFE-AFAFRICA)

 Third Air Force
 52nd Fighter Wing
 52nd Munitions Maintenance Group
 703rd Munition Support Squadron

References

External links

 Volkel Air Base official website (Dutch only)
 Spotting Group Volkel
 Airliners.net - photos taken at Volkel Air Base
 
 

Royal Netherlands Air Force bases
Airports in North Brabant
Maashorst